Jean Martinelli (15 August 1909 – 13 March 1983) was a French actor who appeared in over 50 French films between 1933 and 1983, mostly in supporting roles. One of his few international films was Alfred Hitchcock's classic film To Catch a Thief (1955), where he played the role of a one-legged waiter. Martinelli also worked in television and theatre. He was married to the actress Nadine Basile.

Selected filmography

The Two Orphans (1933) - Roger de Vaudray
All for Love (1933) - Théo
The Abbot Constantine (1933) - Jean Reynaud
La dernière valse (1936) - Le comte Dimitri
La loupiote (1937) - 'Jac' Jacques
Blanchette (1937) - Georges Galoux
 The Red Dancer (1937) - Frantz
La goualeuse (1938) - Pierre Duchemin
The Charterhouse of Parma (1948) - (uncredited)
Dernière Heure, édition spéciale (1949) - L'avocat
Le Furet (1950) - Moncey
Menace de mort (1950) - André Garnier
La vie est un jeu (1951) - Le directeur du journal
 Wonderful Mentality (1953) - Jacques de Fleury
The Three Musketeers (1953) - Athos
La Belle de Cadix (1953) - Dubbing (voice, uncredited)
The Red and the Black (1954) - M. de Rénal
To Catch a Thief (1955) - Mr. Foussard
 Madelon (1955) - Colonel Saint-Marc
If Paris Were Told to Us (1956) - Henri IV / Firmin
Women's Club (1956) - M. Mouss
Police judiciaire (1958) - Le directeur de la P.J.
The President (1961) - Un ministre
Le bonheur est pour demain (1961) - Le Guen
The Count of Monte Cristo (1961) - Vidocq
 The Gentleman from Epsom (1962) - Hybert
Bonne nuit les petits (1963-1966; TV series) - Nounours
Umorismo in nero (1965) - segment 1 'La Bestiole'
Soleil noir (1966) - Le curé
The Jungle Book (1967) - Colonel Hathi and Shere Khan (French version)
Tout le monde il est beau, tout le monde il est gentil (1972) - Le premier président
Jeux pour couples infidèles (1972) - Le P.D.G. / Director
Les anges (1973)
La Bête (1975) - Cardinal Joseph de Balo
The Twelve Tasks of Asterix (1976) - César (voice)
The Diabolic (1977) - Carl Garnis (voice)
 Gloria (1977) - Le grand-père de Jacques
Immoral Women (1979) - Pope
Julien Fontanes, magistrat (1980) - Alain Lavernat

External links 

1909 births
1983 deaths
Male actors from Paris
Sociétaires of the Comédie-Française
French male film actors
French male stage actors
French male television actors
Burials at Père Lachaise Cemetery
20th-century French male actors